Sir Tulaga Manuella, GCMG, MBE (born 26 August 1936)  is a political figure from the Pacific nation of Tuvalu.

Background

Prior to embarking on a political role, Manuella was previously a civil service accountant and secretary of the Church of Tuvalu.

Governor General of Tuvalu

Manuella was appointed Governor-General of Tuvalu on June 21, 1994, as the representative of Elizabeth II, Queen of Tuvalu. He served in this office until June 26, 1998.

Personal honours

Manuella was appointed to the Most Distinguished Order of Saint Michael and Saint George in 1996.

References 

1936 births
Living people
Governors-General of Tuvalu
Knights Grand Cross of the Order of St Michael and St George
Members of the Order of the British Empire
Tuvaluan Congregationalists
Tuvaluan religious leaders